Bhagyanagar  a twin city of Koppal, located one kilometre away from Koppal, is a town panchayat area. The city is known for power handloom work, and is a major producer of saris.

Demographics
As of the 2001 India census, Bhagyanagar had a population of 8873 with 4480 males and 4393 females.
the famous Amba Bhavani Temple and Sri Nimishambha Temple of Soma Vamsha Arya Kshatriya (Chitragar) Society.

Transport
There are buses from Koppal town.

See also
Hampi
Anegondi
Kuknur
Kanakagiri
Yelburga
Karatagi
Kushtagi
Koppal
Karnataka

References

External links
 https://web.archive.org/web/20190810051205/https://koppal.nic.in/

 

Villages in Koppal district